Ernest Fornairon was a French writer, former general secretary of the Groupe Collaboration led by Alphonse de Châteaubriant.

Bibliography 
 La Duchesse de Berry, La Vie amoureuse,
 Complet de la flagorneuse, poèmes, 1928, Mercure de Flandre
 Palmyre, 1930
 Les Belles Filles du Château Vert, 1930
 Félicie, roman, 1931, Mercure de Flandre
 Une femme qui tombe, 1933
 Voyage chez les humoristes français, 1934
 Le Mystère de madame Lafarge, from the film L'Affaire Lafarge (1938), directed by Pierre Chenal
 Le Mystère de la Chavonnière, 1941
 René Madec : Le Mousse devenu nabab, 1942
 Les Dieux du Rhin, 1943
 Ces dames de Chamblas, 1943
 Le Mystère cathare
With Germain Fried, aux éditions Tallandier :
 Le Looping de la mort, novel, 1929 (from a film)
 Mascarade d'amour, 1930 (from a film)
 Anny… de Montparnasse, novel, 1930
 Anny, je t'aime !, 1931  (from a film)
 Le Mystère du pôle, 1931 (from a film)
 Danseurs de cordes, 1931 (from a film)
 Vive l'amour !, novel, 1931 (from a film)
With Léo Joannon :
 La République des jeunes filles, 1929
 Le Souffle du désert, novel, 1931 (from  film)
 La Grâce, roman, 1932 (from a film)
 Au service du tzar, novel, 1932, Sofar-Location (from a film)
 S.O.S., roman, 1932, Sofar-Location (from a film by Carmine Gallone)
 Un amour dans le désert, 1933
With Jean Weilland and René Pichard du Page :
 Pourquoi nous croyons en la collaboration : Speech given on 27 Décembre 1940 at Salle Gaveau, Paris, 1940

External links 

20th-century French non-fiction writers
French collaborators with Nazi Germany